is a Japanese animator, storyboard artist, and director. He goes by the alias  when working as an episode director and key animator. His most notable direction titles include Death Note and the first three seasons of Attack on Titan.

Biography
After graduating from Seibugakuenbunri Junior High School and Senshu University's Department of Humanities, Araki joined Madhouse as a production assistant. He debuted as an episode director in his second year with the company. His directorial debut was 2005's original video animation Otogi-Jūshi Akazukin.

Araki worked with animation director Takayuki Hirao when he was at Madhouse, and he has occasionally worked as a key animator in projects that Hirao has directed. An article featuring him and Hirao was published in the monthly anime magazine Animage.

In October 2013, he won the Best Director award at the Newtype x Machi Asobi Anime Awards 2013, and in 2014 he won the Best Director award in the Anime of the Year category at the Tokyo Anime Award Festival 2014. Araki, along with Death Note character designer Masaru Kitao, also appeared at Anime Expo 2007.

Works

TV series
 Death Note (2006–2007) – Director
 Kurozuka (2008) – Director & Series Composition
 Aoi Bungaku (2009, #5–6) – Director
 Highschool of the Dead (2010) – Director
 Guilty Crown (2011–2012) – Director
 Attack on Titan (2013) – Director
 Kabaneri of the Iron Fortress (2016) – Director
 Attack on Titan Season 2 (2017) – Chief Director
 Attack on Titan Season 3 (2018–2019) – Chief Director

Films
 Death Note: Relight (2007–2008) – Director
 Attack on Titan: Crimson Arrows (2014) – Director
 Attack on Titan: The Wings of Freedom (2015) – Director
 Kabaneri of the Iron Fortress Recap 1: Gathering Light (2016) – Director
 Kabaneri of the Iron Fortress Recap 2: Burning Life (2017) – Director
 Kabaneri of the Iron Fortress: The Battle of Unato (2019) – Director
 Bubble (2022) – Director

OVA
 Otogi-Jūshi Akazukin (2005) – Director
 Highschool of the Dead: Drifters of the Dead (2011) – Director
 Attack on Titan: Ilse's Notebook (2013–2014, 3 episodes) – Director
 Attack on Titan: No Regrets (2014–2015, 2 episodes) – Director

References

External links

 Tetsuro Araki anime at Media Arts Database 

Japanese animators
Anime directors
Japanese animated film directors
Madhouse (company) people
1976 births
Living people
Japanese storyboard artists
Crunchyroll Anime Awards winners
People from Saitama Prefecture